Queen Jeongui of the Gaeseong Wang clan was a Goryeo royal family member as the granddaughter of King Hyeonjong who became the first wife of her first cousin, King Sunjong. Although most Goryeo queens followed their maternal clan, but since Queen Jeongui didn't change her clan, it was speculated that there were some wrong theory written on the records.

References

External links
Queen Jeongui on Encykorea .

10th-century Korean people
Royal consorts of the Goryeo Dynasty
Year of birth unknown
Year of death unknown